Salina is a center of media in north-central Kansas. The following is a list of media outlets based in the city.

Print
Salina has one daily newspaper, The Salina Journal.

Radio
The following radio stations are licensed to and/or broadcast from Salina:

AM

FM

Television
Salina is in the Wichita-Hutchinson, Kansas television market which covers the western two-thirds of the state. 

Cox Communications is the main cable system serving the city. Salina is home to the only Public, educational, and government access (PEG) cable TV channels in the state. Cox customers can see local programming and create their own programming to be shown on channels 20 and 21.

The following television stations are licensed to and/or broadcast from Salina:

References

Mass media in Kansas
Salina, Kansas